The 1824 United States presidential election in New Hampshire took place between October 26 and December 2, 1824, as part of the 1824 United States presidential election. Voters chose eight representatives, or electors to the Electoral College, who voted for President and Vice President.

During this election, the Democratic-Republican Party was the only major national party, and four different candidates from this party sought the Presidency. New Hampshire voted for John Quincy Adams over William H. Crawford, Andrew Jackson, and Henry Clay. Adams won New Hampshire by a margin of 87.18%.

Results

See also
 United States presidential elections in New Hampshire

References

New Hampshire
1824
1824 New Hampshire elections